This is a list of airports in Bolivia, grouped by type and sorted by location.



Airports 

Airport names shown in bold indicate the airport has scheduled service on commercial airlines.

See also 
 Bolivian Air Force (Fuerza Aérea Boliviana)
 Transportation in Bolivia
 List of airports by ICAO code: S#SL - Bolivia
 Wikipedia:WikiProject Aviation/Airline destination lists: South America#Bolivia

References 

 Administración de Aeropuertos y Servicios Auxliares a la Navegación Aérea (AASANA)
 
  - includes IATA codes
 World Aero Data: Airports in Bolivia - ICAO codes, airport data
 Great Circle Mapper: Airports in Bolivia - IATA and ICAO codes
 Name for SLCT - ICAO codes
 Airport records for Bolivia at Landings.com. Retrieved 2013-08-21
 Detailed Bolivia road map (1974)

Bolivia
 
Airports
Airports
Bolivia